Metaxanthia atribasis is a moth of the family Erebidae first described by Walter Rothschild in 1913. It is found in Ecuador, Costa Rica and Panama.

References

Phaegopterina
Arctiinae of South America
Moths described in 1913